Alpine groundsel may refer to:
Packera pauciflora, a plant species from North America
Senecio pectinatus, a plant species from Australia